Carlos Gutiérrez González (born 4 November 1991), also just known as Carlos, is a Spanish footballer as a central defender who plays for Japanese club Machida Zelvia.

Football career 

Born in La Laguna, Canary Islands, Gutiérrez finished his graduation with local CD Tenerife's youth setup, and made his senior debuts with lowly CD Laguna de Tenerife in Tercera División. In July 2012 he joined UD Las Palmas Atlético, also in the fourth level.

On 13 July 2014 Gutiérrez signed a new two-year deal with the Amarillos, being definitely promoted to the main squad in Segunda División. On 22 August, however, he was loaned to fellow league team CD Leganés.

On 24 August 2014 v played his first match as a professional, replacing Sergio Postigo in the 78th minute of a 1–1 home draw against Deportivo Alavés. On 13 January 2016, after spending half of the campaign unregistered, he was loaned to Burgos CF until June.

On 19 July 2016, Gutiérrez rescinded his contract, and signed a one-year deal with CD Numancia a day later. He scored his first professional goal on 3 December of the following year by netting the equalizer in a 3–2 away win against Real Valladolid.

On 9 January 2020, Gutiérrez moved abroad and signed a contract with a Japanese club, Avispa Fukuoka.

On 25 December 2021, Carlos Gutierrez joined to J2 club, Tochigi SC from 2022 season.

On 25 December 2022, Carlos Gutierrez officially signed a contract with J2 club, Machida Zelvia for upcoming 2023 season.

Career statistics

Club 
Updated to the start from 2023 season.

References

External links

1991 births
Living people
Spanish footballers
Footballers from the Canary Islands
Association football defenders
Segunda División players
Segunda División B players
Tercera División players
UD Las Palmas Atlético players
UD Las Palmas players
CD Leganés players
Burgos CF footballers
CD Numancia players
Avispa Fukuoka players
Tochigi SC players
FC Machida Zelvia players
J1 League players
J2 League players
Spanish expatriate footballers
Spanish expatriate sportspeople in Japan
Expatriate footballers in Japan
People from San Cristóbal de La Laguna
Sportspeople from the Province of Santa Cruz de Tenerife